Michael Joiner aka Michael Jeffrey Joiner (born 1958) is an American  actor, stand-up comedian, and film maker. Joiner gained exposure when he starred in Sony Picture's The Grace Card with Oscar winner Louis Gossett Jr. in 2011.

Career
Joiner started his comedy career after performing in a talent show at his church in Valparaiso, IN in 1991. This led to Joiner performing at churches all across the nation, and then later on at comedy clubs, colleges and corporate events. In the early 1990s, Joiner began working as an actor at the community theater in Valparaiso. In early 2000 Michael moved his family to Hollywood, CA where he studied with Kevin Spaceys acting coach, John Swanbeck. He signed with Beverly Hills, CA agent William Kerwin in 2003 and soon after began receiving television commercial and film roles.
In 2008 he moved his family back to Kansas City, MO.

In 2013 he started his own film company Esther Pictures.

Personal life
He resides in Kansas City, MO with his wife Michelle, and their three children.

Awards
 1st-place winner at Funniest Comic in LA Hollywood Improv 2008
 Best Actor Audience choice award (The Grace Card) San Antonio Independent Christian Film Festival 2011
 Christian Music Hall of Fame "Comedian of the year" nominee 2012, Nashville, TN
 Nomination for Best Actor (Abound)  168 Film Festival, Los Angeles, CA. 2013

Comedic style
Joiner's comedy style has been described as "cutting edge clean sarcasm" by the NWI Times newspaper.

References

External links
Robert W. Butler | Local actor/comic Michael Joiner had faith in his career
Leading man in motion picture started locally

Living people
21st-century American comedians
American male film actors
1958 births